Archer Maclean's Mercury is a 2005 puzzle-platform game for the PlayStation Portable developed by the eponymous British game programmer, Archer Maclean and Awesome Studios. In Mercury, the goal is to guide a drop of mercury to its appointed destination by tilting the stage, in a similar fashion to Super Monkey Ball. Levels come in different varieties that prioritize different methods of completing each level. The game was conceived when Archer Maclean used a previous minigame from Jimmy White's Cueball World and added a liquid metal physics. It was originally designed to have motion controls by using a tilt sensor peripheral for the PSP but was never released due to technical constraints.

The game had received positive reception for its original concept and level designs but had received mixed reception for its difficulty. The game's success led to receiving two sequels. The first, titled Mercury Meltdown, was released for PSP, then revised and ported onto PlayStation 2 and Wii. The second sequel, titled Mercury Hg, was released for PlayStation 3 and Xbox 360.

Gameplay

Mercury is a puzzle video game. The player can manipulate a droplet of mercury to move in the player's desire direction by tilting the stage using the PSP's analog stick. The player can use the directional buttons to toggle between focusing on all mercury droplets or a single droplet. The objective of each level in the game is to navigate the mercury around the stage and reach the goal. The HUD is made up of a time limit, a mercury level gauge, and a beacon count. To clear a level, all beacons on the level must be activated within that level's time and mercury limit. If the amount of Mercury on the level drops below the limit or time runs out, the level ends and must be restarted.

Each stage has hazards and obstacles designed to reduce the player's amount of mercury. The mercury can also be split into separate parts by using sharp objects or other hazards in the stage. Paint Shops are floating devices that change the color of the mercury once the mercury is under it. Some switches and doors only activate if interacting with mercury of a specific color. If the mercury is split up, the two droplets can be colored differently; if the two then merge, they form a new color. Color mixing is based on the RGB color model. For example, a red droplet and a green droplet can be merged to form a yellow one.

There is a total of six worlds. Each world is split into three Race levels, three Percentage levels, three Task levels, two Combo levels, and a final boss level. Race levels prioritize completing the level as fast as possible more than mercury count. Percentage levels emphasize preserving Mercury over quick completion. Task levels will have 1 to 6 beacons that must be activated to clear the level. Combo levels are either a combination of Race and Percentage levels or a combination of Percentage and Task levels. There are is each type of combo level in each world available before the boss. Boss levels are a combination of Race, Percentage, and Task. They are the last levels in each world and completing them will result in unlocking the next available world. If the highest score is achieved in all levels of one particular world, a bonus 13th level is unlocked. After all bonus levels are discovered for each world and also achieve the highest scores, a secret 7th world is unlocked.

Development and release
Mercury was developed by Awesome Studios with Archer Maclean as the lead designer for the game. The game was inspired by tilting puzzle games similar to Super Monkey Ball. The game was conceived when Maclean used one of the minigames from Jimmy White's Cueball World and implemented a "liquid metal physics" prototype engine. Maclean chose to study the physics of mercury by obtaining a bottle of real mercury taken from barometers. During development, one of the challenges Awesome Studios had was emulating real mercury physics, how the mercury would split and merge. During play-testing stage of development, Awesome Studios noticed potential shortcuts in the level layouts and adjusted the level design to allow more of them. The game was originally advertised to be released with a tilt sensor peripheral in order to use motion controls, however was unable to be implemented due to cost and technical issues. Maclean chose to release the game on PSP as it could make the game more noticeable for consumers. This led the game to have a tight production schedule to match the launch of the PlayStation Portable, causing the developers to cut corners in the production and resulted in the game to not be as refined as Awesome Studios intended it to be. Mercury was published by Ignition Entertainment and released in North America on April 6, 2005. The game was distributed by Atari for the European version and was released in Europe on September 1, 2005 as a launch title for the PSP; it was followed by an Australian version with its release date of September 21. A limited edition bundle was released with its sequel, Mercury Meltdown on October 19, 2010.

Reception

Mercury received "generally favorable reviews" according to the review aggregation website Metacritic. IGN awarded the name for Best Innovative Design in their "Best of 2005" awards.

The game was praised for its level design and physics. Eurogamer praised the level designs, calling them "ingenious". IGN was impressed with the number of levels and the variety between the different designs. GameSpot, in particular, gave compliments towards the physics of the mercury on how it can be stretched, reassemble and squeeze together." GameSpy, however, gave a lukewarm response to the level design, stating the best ones are clever and addicting but the worst ones make the player jump through too many hoops. Pocket Gamer made comparisons to the Lumines series stating, "Lumines is more fun to play, but Mercury is more satisfying to beat."

In regards to the difficulty, the game had mixed reception. PALGN made noted the difficulty of the game can scale to "ridiculous levels" but defended it by assuring that it doesn't feel impossible." GameSpot noted that the game wasn't impossible even at its most difficult, however, criticized the difficulty pacing, stating "The game pretty much throws you off the deep end almost immediately after you've completed the idiotically simple tutorial." Edge, however, praised the difficulty, stating, "Mercury exhibits a perfect hierarchy of challenge and reward, the two remaining poised throughout and ultimately growing to the point where they touch and become one. The pain becomes the pleasure because, in spite of the extraordinary degree of trial and error, there's never a moment that feels broken or exploitative."

Legacy

Archer Maclean's Mercury inspired two sequels for the game. The first sequel, titled Mercury Meltdown, was released for the PSP. The game features new puzzles and modes, as well as a more vibrant and cartoon-like style of graphics. The game was ported to the PlayStation 2 titled Mercury Meltdown Remix and to the Wii called Mercury Meltdown Revolution.

A second sequel, titled Mercury Hg, was developed by Eiconic Games for Xbox 360 and PlayStation 3. The game adds in 60 new levels, an online leaderboard, and a music feature that allows the mercury blob and stage to pulsate to the player's music. The game was announced in E3 2011. Eiconic chose to go back to the core elements of the original and added a style in which the developers described as "clean and stylish". Ignition Entertainment released the game on September 28, 2011. The game also features ghost racing, the ability to share replays, and Sixaxis tilt controls for the PlayStation 3 version. Two downloadable content (DLC) packages were released for the game. The first DLC titled "Heavy Elements" was released on October 19, 2011, and contains thirty discovery mode levels, ten bonus levels, and five challenges levels. The second DLC titled "Rare Earth Elements" was released on November 29, 2011, and contains the same amount of content as the previous.

References

External links

2005 video games
Marble games
PlayStation Portable games
PlayStation Portable-only games
Puzzle-platform games
UTV Software Communications franchises
Sony Interactive Entertainment games
Video games developed in the United Kingdom
UTV Ignition Games games
Single-player video games